LWI may refer to:

Legal Writing Institute, an American non-profit organization
Lasing without inversion, a laser technique
Living Water International, a faith-based non-profit organization that helps communities in developing countries to create sustainable water, sanitation and hygiene practices